Hollis T. Cline is an American neuroscientist who currently holds the Hahn Professor of Neuroscience position, serves as the Chair of the Neuroscience Department and is also the Director of the Dorris Neuroscience Center at the Scripps Research Institute located in California.

Cline is a Fellow of the American Association for the Advancement of Science and has been honored with awards including the Society for Neuroscience Mika Salpeter Lifetime Achievement Award in 2019. Her research focuses on the impact of sensory experience on brain development and plasticity.

In recognition of her career, Cline was elected a member of the National Academy of Sciences in 2022.

Education and career 
Cline received her bachelor's degree in biology from Bryn Mawr College in 1977. While an undergraduate she worked at Rockefeller University in Christian de Duve’s lab. Cline earned her doctoral degree in neurobiology in 1985 from the University of California, Berkeley, studying nervous system development under the supervision of Gunther Stent. She then joined Martha Constantine-Paton’s lab at Yale University in 1985 for postdoctoral studies, where she began her research on the role of sensory experience in shaping brain development. In 1989, Cline joined Richard W. Tsien’s lab as a postdoctoral fellow at Stanford University Medical Center. Shortly thereafter she was appointed to the faculty in the Department of Physiology and Biophysics at the University of Iowa Medical School. She moved to the Cold Spring Harbor Laboratory in 1994, where she was promoted to Professor in 1998. While at Cold Spring Harbor Laboratory, Cline was the Marie Robertson Professor of Neurobiology, and served as the Director of Research from 2002-2006. During that period, Cline received the NIH Director’s Pioneer Award. She moved to The Scripps Research Institute in 2008, where she is Chair of the Department Neuroscience. Cline was elected a Fellow of the American Association for the Advancement of Science in 2012, "for seminal studies of how sensory experience affects the development of brain structures and function and for generous national and international advisory service to neuroscience". She was awarded the Society for Neuroscience Mika Salpeter Lifetime Achievement Award in 2019. Cline served as the Secretary of the Society for Neuroscience in 2012 and then President of the Society for Neuroscience in 2016. She is a recent member of the Advisory Council for the National Eye Institute and is a current member of the Advisory Council for the National Institute of Neurological Diseases and Stroke and the NIH BRAIN Multi-Council Working Group.

Research 
Cline's research focuses on brain development, in particular the effect of visual experience of the development of the visual system. Her studies have helped increase understanding of mechanisms controlling topographic map formation, neurogenesis, synapse formation and plasticity, neuron development and assembly of brain circuits. Cline’s research showed that sensory input, in particular vision, triggers activity-dependent cellular and molecular mechanisms that control the development of neurons, brain circuits and behavior, ultimately by regulating the formation and stability of synapses. This model suggests that diverse molecular and cellular mechanisms that affect synapse stability will ultimately impact brain connectivity and function. More recently, Cline has shown that exosomes are involved in the development of neurons and brain circuitry. Cline’s studies have relevance to a variety of developmental neurological disorders such as Fragile X Syndrome, Rett Syndrome, autism spectrum disorders, and schizophrenia - which are the result of errors in the development of synaptic function and brain circuitry. Alongside her research, Cline is known for her work as a mentor and advocate.

Awards and honours 
1991 McKnight Neuroscience Scholar Award
2005 National Institutes of Health Director's Pioneer Award
2012 Fellow of the American Association for the Advancement of Science
2013 The Scripps Research Institute Outstanding Mentor Award
2016 President of the Society for Neuroscience
2019 Society for Neuroscience Mika Salpeter Lifetime Achievement Award

Selected publications

Cline serves on the editorial boards of the Oxford Research Encyclopedia of Neuroscience, Frontiers in Neural Circuits, Journal of Developmental Biology, and Neural Development.

See also

 Society for Neuroscience
 Scripps Research

References

Living people
American women neuroscientists
American neuroscientists
Bryn Mawr College alumni
University of California, Berkeley alumni
Scripps Research faculty
University of Iowa faculty
Yale University faculty
Year of birth missing (living people)
Members of the United States National Academy of Sciences